Auðun Helgason (born 18 June 1974) is a retired Icelandic footballer

Club career
Auðun started at FH Hafnarfjördur and went on to play for clubs in Switzerland, Norway, Belgium and Sweden before returning to Iceland.

International career
He made his debut for Iceland in an August 1998 friendly match against Latvia in which he scored his only international goal. He went on to win 35 caps, scoring one goal. His last international match was an October 2005 World Cup qualifying match against Sweden.

References

External links
 

1974 births
Living people
Audun Helgason
Audun Helgason
Audun Helgason
Neuchâtel Xamax FCS players
Viking FK players
K.S.C. Lokeren Oost-Vlaanderen players
Landskrona BoIS players
Swiss Super League players
Belgian Pro League players
Eliteserien players
Allsvenskan players
Audun Helgason
Expatriate footballers in Switzerland
Expatriate footballers in Norway
Expatriate footballers in Belgium
Expatriate footballers in Sweden
Audun Helgason
Audun Helgason
Audun Helgason
Audun Helgason
Association football central defenders